Corona de lágrimas is a Mexican telenovela, written and produced by Manuel Canseco Noriega and Valentín Pimstein for Telesistema Mexicano in 1965. It stars Prudencia Grifell, Enrique del Castillo and Jorge Lavat.

Plot 
It is the story of a mother who suffers from her three children, and one of her sons despises her and does not support the poverty in which his family live.

Cast 
Prudencia Grifell as Refugio Moncada de Chavero "Doña Cuca"
Enrique del Castillo as Ignacio Chavero Moncada
Jorge Lavat as Edmundo "Dandy" Chavero Moncada
Evita Muñoz as Olga Ancira
Raúl Meraz as Fernando Chavero Moncada
Pilar Sen as Julieta de Fuentes
Aurora Alvarado as Lucero Fuentes

Versions 
In 1968, a film version with the same name was made, also written by Canseco Noriega and adapted and directed by Alejandro Galindo. In 2012, a free version of the same soap opera adaptation of Jesús Calzada and produced by José Alberto Castro was performed.

References

External links 
 

Spanish-language telenovelas
Mexican telenovelas
Televisa telenovelas
1965 telenovelas
1965 Mexican television series debuts
1965 Mexican television series endings

es:Corona de lágrimas (telenovela de 1965)